HD 102956 b or Isagel is an extrasolar planet discovered in 2010 by a team of American astronomers led by John Johnson using Doppler spectroscopy and the Keck Observatory in Hawaii. HD 102956 b is in the orbit of host star HD 102956. The planet is at most the mass of Jupiter, orbiting every 6.5 days at a distance of 12 million km. HD 202956 b has a very circular orbit. The system is roughly 399 light years from us.

Discovery and nomenclature
 The name HD 102956 derives directly from the fact that the star is the 102,956th star catalogued in the Henry Draper catalog. The designation of b is given to the first planet orbiting a given star. 

The star is one of the 2.5 million brightest stars in the sky and is part of the Tycho-2 Catalogue. It is not visible to the naked eye with an apparent magnitude of 8.

NameExoWorlds 
In 2019 this planet was announced as part of the IAU NameExoWorlds project where it was designated as the planet that will be named by Sweden. The winning proposal was Isagel, from Nobel laureate Harry Martinson's space poem Aniara.

Characteristics Host Star 
HD 102956 (Aniara) is an orange subgiant with a mass and radius of 1.68 and 4.4 solar, respectively. The surface temperature is about 5054 Kelvin. The luminosity of the star exceeds that of the sun by 11.6 times. The star's age is estimated at about 2.3 billion years.

Habitability and possibility of life
Since HD 102956 b is a hot Jupiter it is unlikely that it harbors life.

References

Exoplanets discovered in 2010
Giant planets
Ursa Major (constellation)
Exoplanets detected by radial velocity
Exoplanets with proper names